U Lacertae is a spectroscopic binary star in the constellation Lacerta.

Despite being in the constellation of Lacerta, U Lacertae is considered to be a member of the Cepheus OB1 association. It has been listed as a member of the open cluster ASCC 123.

U Lacertae is a VV Cephei binary consisting of a red supergiant and a small hot companion. The companion has been identified from a high excitation component in the spectrum and from radial velocity variations, but the orbit is unknown.

U Lacertae is a variable star classified as a semiregular variable. The periodicity is uncertain but a main period of 150 days and a long secondary period of 550 – 690 days have been suggested. A study of Hipparcos satellite photometry found an amplitude of 0.77 magnitudes and found no periodicity.  The General Catalogue of Variable Stars lists an amplitude of 2.7 magnitudes.

Water masers have been detected around U Lacertae, common in the extended atmospheres of very luminous cool stars.

See also 
 List of largest stars

References

M-type supergiants
Binary stars
Lacerta (constellation)
Lacertae, U
215924
112545
Durchmusterung objects
J22474341+5509303
Semiregular variable stars
Emission-line stars